Austrochloritis is a genus of air-breathing land snails, terrestrial pulmonate gastropod mollusks in the family Camaenidae.

Species
Species within the genus Austrochloritis include:

 Austrochloritis ascensa
 Austrochloritis pusilla

References

 
Camaenidae
Taxonomy articles created by Polbot